The 1948 Challenge Desgrange-Colombo was the first edition of the Challenge Desgrange-Colombo. It included nine races - seven one-day races and two stage races - all in Belgium, France or Italy.

Races

Final standings

Riders

Nations

References

 
Challenge Desgrange-Colombo
Challenge Desgrange-Colombo